Erik Sjøqvist (16 October 1900 – 11 August 1978) was a Danish fencer. He competed in the individual and team foil competitions at the 1924 Summer Olympics.

References

External links
 

1900 births
1978 deaths
Danish male fencers
Olympic fencers of Denmark
Fencers at the 1924 Summer Olympics
Sportspeople from Frederiksberg